The 7-cubic honeycomb or hepteractic honeycomb is the only regular space-filling tessellation (or honeycomb) in Euclidean 7-space.

It is analogous to the square tiling of the plane and to the cubic honeycomb of 3-space.

There are many different Wythoff constructions of this honeycomb. The most symmetric form is regular, with Schläfli symbol {4,35,4}. Another form has two alternating 7-cube facets (like a checkerboard) with Schläfli symbol {4,34,31,1}. The lowest symmetry Wythoff construction has 128 types of facets around each vertex and a prismatic product Schläfli symbol {∞}7.

Related honeycombs 
The [4,35,4], Coxeter group generates 255 permutations of uniform tessellations, 135 with unique symmetry and 134 with unique geometry. The expanded 7-cubic honeycomb is geometrically identical to the 7-cubic honeycomb.

The 7-cubic honeycomb can be alternated into the 7-demicubic honeycomb, replacing the 7-cubes with 7-demicubes, and the alternated gaps are filled by 7-orthoplex facets.

Quadritruncated 7-cubic honeycomb 
A quadritruncated 7-cubic honeycomb, contains all tritruncated 7-orthoplex facets and is the Voronoi tessellation of the D7* lattice.

See also 
List of regular polytopes

References 
 Coxeter, H.S.M. Regular Polytopes, (3rd edition, 1973), Dover edition,  p. 296, Table II: Regular honeycombs
 Kaleidoscopes: Selected Writings of H. S. M. Coxeter, edited by F. Arthur Sherk, Peter McMullen, Anthony C. Thompson, Asia Ivic Weiss, Wiley-Interscience Publication, 1995,  
 (Paper 24) H.S.M. Coxeter, Regular and Semi-Regular Polytopes III, [Math. Zeit. 200 (1988) 3-45]

Honeycombs (geometry)
8-polytopes
Regular tessellations